Thomas Maskill (2 May 1903 – July 1956) was an English professional footballer who played as a full back and a half-back in the Football League for Coventry City, Carlisle United, Barnsley and York City, in non-League football for Poppleton Road Old Boys, Acomb WMC and Selby Town and in Welsh football for Caernarvon Athletic and Rhyl United. He was an England schoolboy international. After retiring he worked as a coach at Leeman Road United.

References

1903 births
Footballers from York
1956 deaths
English footballers
Association football defenders
Association football midfielders
York City F.C. players
Coventry City F.C. players
Caernarvon Athletic F.C. players
Rhyl F.C. players
Scarborough F.C. players
Carlisle United F.C. players
Barnsley F.C. players
Selby Town F.C. players
Midland Football League players
English Football League players